Pope Simeon I of Alexandria (fl. 695), 42nd Pope of Alexandria & Patriarch of the See of St. Mark.

The first pope elected from among the Syrians to the See of St. Mark was Pope Simeon I. He was a monk in the Pateron Monastery (Deir Al-Zugag). The Synaxarium links Simeon to his Syrian heritage by mentioning to his readers that Severus of Antioch was buried in the monastery. The Synaxarium attests to his saintly life. There were two attempts to poison Pope Simeon and he survived both of them. Pope Simeon was a great reformer. He fought very fiercely against a new trend among Coptic men who began emulating the Arabs by taking more than one wife.

External links

Coptic-Syriac Relations beyond Dogmatic Rhetoric
Coptic Live of Saints- 24 Abib:- Departure of St. Simeon I, 42nd Pope of Alexandria.

7th-century Coptic Orthodox popes of Alexandria
Syrian Oriental Orthodox Christians
699 deaths
Syrian archbishops